Czarina Maria "China" D. Capili-Jocson, married name Cojuangco, is a Filipina crisis management strategist and former journalist who served as the Assistant to the Presidential Spokesperson (Deputy to the Presidential Spokesperson) in the administration of President Rodrigo Duterte. In April 2018, she was appointed by the Special Envoy of the Philippines to the United States as its Deputy to the Ambassador, then eventually the office's official representative.

She was a news presenter for GMA News and Public Affairs (2003–2006) and later on, spearheaded the lifestyle content of GMA Online (2010–2015).

China Jocson Cojuangco is currently involved in pursuing her late husband's philantrophic legacy, through the Little Blue Chair initiative.

Family and background
She is the granddaughter of Atty. Tomas P. Matic who was Government Corporate Counsel during President Diosdado Macapagal’s administration. She is also kin to former Bureau of Internal Revenue Director, Umiral P. Matic, who was controversially kidnapped and killed  while serving then Vice President Joseph Estrada.

She is the sole successor to her maternal grandmother Doña Marcela Jocson of Pampanga and the daughter of Robert Capili y Pasion Rodriguez (deceased) a trustee at Zuellig Pharma Corporation.

She and Tarlac 1st district representative Carlos "Charlie" Cojuangco were married on April 7, 2021. She has a daughter from a previous relationship.

References

Living people
Year of birth missing (living people)
People from Manila
Filipino women in politics
Filipino women diplomats
Filipino women journalists
Members of the Presidential Communications Group of the Philippines
Duterte administration personnel
GMA Integrated News and Public Affairs people